Heraios (Bactrian: Ηλου Ēlou, sometimes Heraus, Heraos, Miaos) was apparently a king or clan chief of the Kushans (reign: c. 1 –30 CE), one of the five constituent tribes of the Yuezhi, in Bactria, in the early 1st century CE.

Several scholars question his existence as a separate historical figure and suggest that "Heraios" may have been another name for his nominal successor Kujula Kadphises. For example, numismatist Joe Cribb points out the similarity of coins minted by Kujula to those of a Greco-Bactrian predecessor named Hermaios Soter (or Hermaeus Soter). Moreover, some portraits of Kujula resemble Hermaios, suggesting that Kujula may have initially reused the design of coins issued during the reign of Hermaios Soter.

The coins bearing the name Heraios were silver and made in the Hellenistic style, using the Greek script. The reverse shows the winged Greek goddess of victory Nike holding out a wreath, over Heraios mounted on a horse. He wears a tunic and has a large bow on the side. Some portraits show Heraios with a marked artificial skull deformation, a characteristic of several Kushan portraits and sculptures of the 1st century CE. On some of the Heraios coins, his name has sometimes been read as ΗΛΟΥ or ΗΙΛΟΥ, which has been transliterated as "Ilou". However other readings of the same texts include "Maou" and "Miaou".

References

Sources
  
 

Kushan emperors
1st-century monarchs in Asia